The Toy of the Tsarina (German: Das Spielzeug der Zarin) is a 1919 German silent historical drama film directed by Rudolf Meinert and starring Ellen Richter, Karl Berger, and Max Kronert.

Cast
Ellen Richter as Katharina II.
Karl Berger as Lieutenant Tschekin
Max Kronert as Hauptmann Wlassiew
Hugo Falke as Lieutenant Mirowitsch
Max Laurence as Chamberlain
R. Mantolu as Henker
Joseph Römer as Count Orlow
Else Wasa as Frau von Mellin

Bibliography
Bergfelder, Tim & Bock, Hans-Michael. The Concise Cinegraph: Encyclopedia of German. Berghahn Books, 2009.

External links

Films of the Weimar Republic
German silent feature films
German historical films
Films directed by Rudolf Meinert
1910s historical films
Films about Catherine the Great
German black-and-white films
1910s German films